Walls is a 1968 Hungarian drama film directed by András Kovács. It was entered into the 6th Moscow International Film Festival where it won a Diploma.

Cast
 Miklós Gábor as Benkõ Béla
 Zoltán Latinovits as Ambrus László
 Philippe March as Lendvay
 László Mensáros as Ferenczi
 Imre Ráday as Szamosi (as Rádai Imre)
 Zsuzsa Bánki as Benkõné, Erzsi
 Mari Szemes as Ambrusné, Anna
 Judit Tóth as Márta
 Andrea Drahota as Zsuzsa
 Bernadette Lafont as Marie
 Tamás Major as Fõszerkesztõ

References

External links
 

1968 films
1968 drama films
Hungarian drama films
1960s Hungarian-language films
Hungarian black-and-white films
Films directed by András Kovács